Sofia Djelal (Arabic: صفية جلال, born 4 March 1983) is a Paralympian athlete from Algeria competing mainly in category F56-58 javelin throw events.

She competed in the 2004 Summer Paralympics in Athens, Greece. There she won a gold medal in the women's F56-F58 javelin throw event.  She also competed in the F56-F58 shot put and discus events.

External links
 

1983 births
Living people
Paralympic athletes of Algeria
Paralympic gold medalists for Algeria
Paralympic silver medalists for Algeria
Athletes (track and field) at the 2004 Summer Paralympics
Athletes (track and field) at the 2008 Summer Paralympics
Athletes (track and field) at the 2012 Summer Paralympics
Athletes (track and field) at the 2016 Summer Paralympics
Athletes (track and field) at the 2020 Summer Paralympics
Medalists at the 2004 Summer Paralympics
Medalists at the 2012 Summer Paralympics
Medalists at the 2020 Summer Paralympics
Paralympic medalists in athletics (track and field)
21st-century Algerian people
Algerian javelin throwers
Algerian female shot putters
Wheelchair javelin throwers
Wheelchair shot putters
Paralympic javelin throwers
Paralympic shot putters
20th-century Algerian women
21st-century Algerian women